Squad 38 is a South Korean television series starring Ma Dong-seok, Seo In-guk and Choi Soo-young. It aired on cable network OCN on Fridays and Saturdays at 23:00 (KST) for 16 episodes from June 17, 2016 to August 6, 2016.

Synopsis
The story is about civil servant Baek Sung-il and his team who collect taxes from habitual tax evaders as well as delinquent taxpayers in cooperation with the fraud Yang Jeong-do.

Origin of title
Squad 38 is motivated and received advice from "38 Tax Collection Division" (aka 38기동대: Task force 38) in Seoul Metropolitan Government.

The number 38 is derived from Article 38 of Constitution of South Korea, which stipulates the duty to pay taxes:
모든 국민은 법률이 정하는 바에 의하여 납세의 의무를 진다.All citizens shall have the duty to pay taxes under the conditions as prescribed by Act.

The Korean title "사기동대 (sagidongdae)" is the combination of the words 사기 (sagi: fraud) and 기동대 (gidongdae: task force). In the logo of this series, letter of 사기 is written in blue and underlined to emphasize.

The motto of the drama, "끝까지 사기쳐서 반드시 징수한다" (Swindle to the end, must be collected.) is parody of, the motto of 38 Tax Collection Division, "끝까지 추적하여 반드시 징수한다" (Trace to the end, must be collected.)

Cast

Main cast
Ma Dong-seok as Baek Sung-il/Park Woong-cheol – manager of Tax Collection Bureau's section 3
Seo In-guk as Yang Jeong-do – professional swindler
Choi Soo-young as Cheon Sung-hee – Tax Collection Bureau's officer

Supporting cast

38 Revenue Collection Unit
Song Ok-sook as Noh Bang-shil – nickname "Wallet"
 as Jang Hak-joo – nickname "Cannon"
Ko Kyu-pil as Jung Ja-wang – nickname "Keyboard"
Lee Sun-bin as Jo Mi-joo – nickname "Kkotbaem" = flower-snake (literally) = seductive girl (meaning)
Kim Joo-ri as Choi Ji-yeon

Seowon Town Hall
Ahn Nae-sang as Cheon Gap-soo – Seowon Mayor
Jo Woo-jin as Ahn Tae-wook – director of Tax Collection Bureau
 as Kang Noh-seung – manager of Tax Collection Bureau's section 1
 as Ahn Chang-ho – young employee of Tax Collection Bureau
Kim Joo-hun as examiner Park – examiner of Tax Collection Bureau's section 3
Jung Do-won as examiner Kim – examiner of Tax Collection Bureau's section 3

Extended cast
Jung In-gi as Sa Jae-sung – detective
Lee Ho-jae as Choi Cheol-woo – former representative of Woohyang Group
 as Bang Pil-gyu – Choi Cheol-woo's right arm
Oh Dae-hwan as Ma Jin-seok
Lee Deok-hwa as chairman Wang

Others

 as taxation officer
Oh Yoo-jin as Baek Ah-jeong – Baek Sung-il's daughter
Jo Seon-joo as Baek Sung-il's wife
 as Kim Gyu-sik
Lee Seung-hyung as Cheon Gap-soo's secretary
 as section chief Shim Yong-jae
 as Bang Ho-seok
Ji Sung-geun
Kim Eung-soo as Jo Sang-jin
 as Yang Jae-taek
 as Noh Deok-gi
Jo Yeon-hee as Baek Sung-il's wife
Kang Min-tae as Jang Hak-joo band's member
Geum Gwang-san as Jang Hak-joo band's member

Lee Seon-goo

Kwon Ban-seok

Lee Gyu-tae
Hwang Tae-ho
Gong Min-gyu

Kim Ji-sung as Bang Mi-na
 as police chief Jin Seon-hwan
Lee Cho-ah
Kim Bo-bae
Park Byung-wook
Kim Ki-nam
Baek Seung-cheol

Lee Dong-jin
Jung Ae-hwa
Seo Min-kyung
Ha Soo-yeon

Kim Hae-gon
Yoon Man-dal as Park Sang-ho
Hong Dae-sung
Moon Hak-jin
Kim Jong-doo
Kim Sung-il
Jo Gi-tae
Park Do-joon
Jung Jae-sung
Lee Shi-yoo as Choi Mi-sook

Cameo appearances
Oh Man-seok as Park Deok-bae
 as Cha Myung-soo
Lee Se-young (Ep. 3)
Park Sung-woong (Ep. 2)
Kim Sung-oh (Ep. 2)

Production
The series' main cast lineup was unveiled on March 3, 2016.

The first script reading was held on March 19, 2016 at the CJ E&M Centre in Sangam-dong, Seoul, South Korea.

Ratings

In the table below, the blue numbers represent the lowest ratings and the red numbers represent the highest ratings.

Original soundtracks

OST Part 1

OST Part 2

International broadcast

The broadcasting rights to the series were sold to 11 countries, China, Cambodia, Japan, Hong Kong, Taiwan, Malaysia, Singapore, Indonesia, the Philippines, Australia and New Zealand.

Awards and nominations

References

External links
  
 Squad 38 at Studio Dragon
 Squad 38 at SM C&C
 
 

OCN television dramas
Korean-language television shows
2016 South Korean television series debuts
2016 South Korean television series endings
South Korean crime television series
Television series by Studio Dragon
Television series by SM C&C